The Internal Troops of the Ministry of Internal Affairs is a Internal Troops - paramilitary law enforcement force in the Republic of Belarus under the national Ministry of Internal Affairs. All personnel are trained in the Internal Troops College of the Military Academy of Belarus.

History
The Internal Troops trace their history to a separate command of guards in Vitebsk, formed on 18 March 1918. Subsequently, the team was transformed into the 5th Byelorussian Convoy Regiment. Later, as the organs of the internal troops of the Ministry of Internal Affairs, units of NKVD were formed. All of the units participated in Russian Civil War, the Second World War, the Soviet–Afghan War and in responding to the aftermath of the 1986 Chernobyl disaster in the country's southwest.

On 22 November 1968, the 22nd Department of Escort and Protection (sometimes translated as Convoy and Protection) was reorganized as the 43rd Escort [or Convoy] Division, with its headquarters at Minsk. Two years later it had reached a strength of three escort or convoy regiments, a motorized regiment, and an independent special motorized militia battalion. At the end of the 1980s, Internal Troops units were involved in the inter ethnic conflicts in the territory of the Soviet Union.

After the dissolution of the Soviet Union, the formations and units of the troops deployed in Belarus became the Internal Troops of the Ministry of Internal Affairs of the Republic of Belarus, created on the organizational basis of the 43rd Convoy Division.

On 3 June 1993, the Law of the Republic of Belarus "On Internal Troops of the Ministry of Internal Affairs of the Republic of Belarus" was adopted, the process of qualitative changes and reforming began. In 1994, civil defense headquarters was incorporated into the internal troops. On 8 November 1995, President Alexander Lukashenko approved the organizational structure and deployment of internal troops. On 7 May 1998, the internal troops were presented with the Combat Banners and new state symbols.

The conclusion of the process of reforming the troops was declared on 19 June 2001. The corresponding decree provides for the establishment of the Day of Internal Troops on March 18, celebrated annually. In 2003, the Belarusian House of Representatives adopted a new version of the Law "On Internal Troops of the Ministry of Internal Affairs of the Republic of Belarus".

After the elections and protests in 2020, some of the leaders of the internal troops came under sanctions. Namely, on October 2, 2020, the European Union included in its sanctions list the commander of the Internal Troops Yuri Nazarenko and his deputy Khazalbek Atabekov, on December 17 – the first deputy commander of the internal troops and the chief of staff Igor Burmistrov, and on June 21, 2021 – the new commander of the Internal Troops Mikalai Karpiankou. The United Kingdom and Switzerland also imposed sanctions against these four individuals. In addition, Atabekov, Nazarenko and Karpiankou were included in the Canadian sanctions list and in the SDN list of the US.

On 21 June 2021, the U.S. Treasury has added the Internal Troops themselves to the SDN list.

Excerpt from the statement by the U.S. Treasury:

The Internal Troops of the Ministry of Internal Affairs of the Republic of Belarus (Internal Troops), a Belarusian police force subordinate to the Ministry of Internal Affairs (MVD), has been involved in the violent suppression of peaceful protesters in multiple locations in Belarus since the August 9, 2020, fraudulent presidential election.  On October 2, 2020, OFAC designated the Internal Troops’ then-Commander Yuriy Nazaranka and Deputy Commander Khazalbek Atabekau pursuant to E.O. 13405 for being responsible for, or having participated in, actions or policies that undermine democratic processes or institutions in Belarus.

Organization

As of 2020, they consist of the following elements:

 High Command of the Internal Troops
 Special Purpose Brigades
 3rd Separate Special-Purpose Brigade (Minsk)
 Police Brigades
 2nd Separate Special-Police Brigade
 4th Separate Special-Police Brigade
 5th Separate Special-Police Brigade
 6th Separate Special-Police Brigade
 7th Separate Special-Police Brigade
 2 security teams
 7 battalions
 2nd Separate Special-Police Battalion
 5th Separate Special-Purpose Battalion

Gallery

Missions
The missions of the Internal Troops are as follows:
Guard important cargo 
Guard corrective institutions
Maintain social order and stop violations of the law that risk public safety 
Dismantle illegal armed formations
Prevent domestic and foreign terrorism on Belarusian soil
Prepares for combined arms operations in the event of armed conflict

Commanders 

 Major General Yury Nazarenko
 Nikolai Karpenkov (since 20 November 2020)

References

External links

Military of Belarus
Law enforcement agencies of Belarus
Military units and formations established in 1991
1991 establishments in Belarus
Belarusian entities subject to the U.S. Department of the Treasury sanctions
Specially Designated Nationals and Blocked Persons List
Gendarmerie